The Belgium men's national tennis team represents Belgium in Davis Cup tennis competition and are governed by the Royal Belgian Tennis Federation.

History
Belgium competed in its first Davis Cup in 1904 when it achieved its best result until 2015, a final lost to the British Isles. They made the final again, in 2015, when they lost to Great Britain yet again. They reached the final again in 2017, losing again, this time against France.

Current squad
Player information and rankings

Recent results

2000–2009

2010–2019

2020–present

See also 
 Belgium Fed Cup team

External links

Davis Cup teams
Tennis
Tennis in Belgium